The 16th TCA Awards were presented by the Television Critics Association. The ceremony was held on July 14, 2000, at the Ritz-Carlton Huntington Hotel and Spa in Pasadena, California.

Winners and nominees

Multiple wins 
The following shows received multiple wins:

Multiple nominations 
The following shows received multiple nominations:

References

External links 
 Official website 
 2000 TCA Awards at IMDb.com

2000 television awards
2000 in American television
TCA Awards ceremonies
TCA